Heteromyza rotundicornis is a species of fly in the family Heleomyzidae. It is found in the  Palearctic .

References

Heleomyzidae
Insects described in 1846
Muscomorph flies of Europe